Peter B. Jahrling is chief of the Emerging Viral Pathogens Section of the National Institute of Allergy and Infectious Diseases.

Jahrling received his PhD in medical microbiology from Cornell Medical College. He joined the military as an officer at the U.S. Army Medical Research Institute of Infectious Diseases (USAMRIID), and remained employed as a civilian after his service. Since 2005, Jahrling has been the chief scientist of the NIAID Integrated Research Facility in Frederick, Maryland, and chief of the Emerging Viral Pathogens Section.

His research focuses on the development of animal models for viruses infecting humans, strategies for vaccination and treatment of serious viral pathogens, and characterization of newly discovered viruses. He oversees BSL-4 labs at Fort Detrick.

The Hot Zone mentions Jahrling's early research in Ebola virus. He is portrayed in the first season of The Hot Zone television series by Topher Grace.

Awards 
 2003 Elected fellow of the American Association for the Advancement of Science
 Secretary of Defense Medal for Meritorious Civilian Service
 Federal Career Service Outstanding Professional Award
 Department of the Army Achievement Medal for Civilian Service
 Order of Military Medical Merit
 Joel M. Dalrymple Award for Distinguished Medical Service, Association of Military Surgeons of the United States
 Lifetime Achievement Award for Excellence in Filovirus Research

See also
 Lisa Hensley

References

American virologists
Living people
Weill Cornell Medical College alumni
Year of birth missing (living people)